The 2015 Great Yarmouth Borough Council election took place on 7 May 2015 to elect just under one third of members of Great Yarmouth Borough Council in England as one of the English local elections coinciding with the 2015 General Election, four of the smaller wards of the 17 forming the borough (which had fewer than 3 members each) had no election in 2015.  A second-tier local authority, an election is held in three years out of four (on the by-thirds basis) electing councillors for a four-year term - in the year without elections the all-out elections to the top-tier local authority, Norfolk County Council are held.

Election results
No gains from any party group to any other took place across the 13 seats up for election: 8 held by the Conservatives and 5 were held by Labour.  The council remained in no overall control of any single party grouping and local Labour councillors continued to form the single largest group.

|}

Ward results

Bradwell North

Bradwell South and Hopton

Caister North

Caister South

Central and Northgate

Claydon

Fleggburgh

Lothingland

Magdalen

Nelson

Ormesby

St. Andrew's

West Flegg

References

2015 English local elections
May 2015 events in the United Kingdom
2015
2010s in Norfolk